Fath Tehran F.C. was an Iranian Football club based in Tehran, Iran. It was the first club of former Bayern Munich midfielder Ali Karimi, and former VfL Bochum striker Vahid Hashemian.

References

Football clubs in Iran
Defunct football clubs in Iran